The following are the association football events of the year 1894 throughout the world.

Events

Clubs founded in 1894

Austria
First Vienna FC

Belgium
K.F.C. Rhodienne-Verrewinkel
Sporting Club de Bruxelles

England
Hastings United F.C.
Marine F.C.
Redhill F.C.
Manchester City Football Club
Bristol City F.C.

Germany
Karlsruher SC

Netherlands
BV Veendam

Scotland
Dumbarton Harp F.C.

Sweden
GAIS

Switzerland
FC La Chaux-de-Fonds

National champions

Argentina
Primera División Winners:
Lomas Athletic Club

Denmark
Football Tournament Winners:
Akademisk Boldklub

England
First Division Winners:
Aston Villa
FA Cup Winners:
Notts County

France
French Championship:
Standard Athletic Club

Ireland
Football League Winners:
Glentoran
Irish Cup Winners:
Lisburn Distillery

Netherlands
Football League Winners:
RAP Amsterdam

Scotland
First Division Winners:
Celtic FC
Scottish Cup Winners:
Rangers

Wales
Welsh Cup Winners:
Chirk AAA

International tournaments
1894 British Home Championship (February 24 – April 7, 1894)

Births
January 15 – Henk Steeman, Dutch international footballer (d. 1979)
August 14 – Jack Butler, English international footballer and manager (d. 1961)
December 24 – Evert Bulder, Dutch international footballer (d. 1973)

References

 
Association football by year